is a V-Cinema release, based on Kaizoku Sentai Gokaiger, the 35th entry of the Super Sentai franchise. It had a limited theatrical release on November 12, 2021, followed by its DVD and Blu-ray release on March 9, 2022. The V-Cinema commemorates the 10th anniversary of the series, making Gokaiger the fourth series in the franchise to receive a tenth-anniversary special film after Ninpuu Sentai Hurricaneger, Tokusou Sentai Dekaranger and Engine Sentai Go-onger.

Plot
Ten years after the Gokaigers defeated the Space Empire Zangyack, Don Dogoier pays a visit to Earth, where he learns of a new gambling sport called "Super Sentai Derby Colosseum" where copies of the Super Sentai across history created from their respective Ranger Keys using Basco Ta Jolokia's Rapparatta take part in battles. All Super Sentai except for the Gokaigers willingly relinquished their keys to support the project so long as the money is used for defending the Earth. Don reunites with Gai Ikari, who cooperates with the Colosseum project along the Ministry of Defense and asks for his Ranger Key, but Don claims that he lost it after the Gokai Galleon was destroyed and the team disbanded.

Captain Marvelous appears on Earth determined to bring down the Colosseum, but is captured by Luka Millfy, who delivers him along with her own Ranger Key in exchange for money. Refusing to give up, Marvelous agrees on a bet with the Colosseum administration in which he must defeat one hundred Sentai alone, under the condition of giving up on his Ranger Key should he loses and the dissolution of the Colosseum should he wins. Having defeated 99 enemies, Marvelous is surprised when Gai appears before him as the final opponent, determined to protect the Colosseum for the sake of Earth. By the interference of one of the Minister's assistants, Gai defeats Marvelous, who is rescued by Ahim de Famile. In response, the Minister brands the duo as fugitives and send the Sentai clones after them. Don, Gai and Ministry assistant Niwano attempt to intercede in their favor, but are arrested instead.

In prison, Don uses a wiretap he put on Gai's Ranger Key to discover the Minister's plan to use the Ranger Keys to conquer the universe and helps Gai and Niwano to escape. They rendezvous with Marvelous and Ahim who defeat the attackers with Joe Gibken's help. After the battle, Marvelous recognizes Niwano as the boy he saved 10 years ago during their first visit on Earth and reveals that the Ministry is working with the Bakut Pirates, whom he is chasing after since they destroyed the Gokai Galleon and apparently gouged his left eye. Meanwhile, using Don's Ranger Key, Luka storms the Ministry's office to rescue him and uses the Shield of Veritas that Ahim previously stole from Planet Crystaria to reveal the minister's assistants as the Bakut Pirates in disguise, while Don uses a recording from his tap to expose the minister's crimes before the public. The minister attempts to escape with the Ranger Keys, but Niwano stops him. Reunited, the six Gokaigers fight the Bakut Pirates and destroy them using the Gokai Galleon Key, created from the Gokai Galleon's core which Joe retrieved from its remains and reunite with Navi, joining together for a meal. In the occasion, Gai apologizes to Marvelous for challenging him and Marvelous reveals that he did not lose an eye during his fight and just had a cyst, using an eyepatch to protect it.

Cast
: 
: 
: 
: 
: 
: 
: 
Ring announcer, Narration, Gokaiger Equipment Voice: 
: 
: 
: 
Children: , 
Old man: 
Old woman: 
High school girls: , 
Curry restaurant owner: 
: 
: 
: 
Minister of Defense: 
:

Theme song

Lyrics: Shoko Fujibayashi, Naruhisa Arakawa
Composition & Arrangement: Kenichiro Ōishi
Artist: Project.R

Notes

References

External Links
 at Toei Company